Alatoz is a municipality in Albacete, Castile-La Mancha, Spain. It has a population of 531.

See also
 Manchuela
 Church of San Juan Bautista (Alatoz)

References

External links 
 Alatoz - Web de la Diputación.
 Alatoz and comarca.
 Caminos de Santiago in Albacete

Municipalities of the Province of Albacete